If You Think You Can, You Can! is a live video album by Taiwanese singer Jolin Tsai. It was released on June 8, 2007, by EMI. It chronicled the Taipei dates of the Dancing Forever World Tour from November 17 to 19, 2006, one documentary film, and four music videos from Dancing Forever (2006). It sold more than 120,000 copies in Taiwan, and it topped the video album sales chart of 2007 of G-Music.

Background and release 
On September 15, 2006, Tsai embarked on her second concert tour Dancing Forever World Tour at Hong Kong Coliseum in Hong Kong, China. On May 14, 2007, EMI announced that the live video album for the tour would be available for pre-order on May 25, 2007 and would be released on June 8, 2007. The album chronicled the Taipei dates of the tour at Taipei Arena from November 17 to 19, 2006, one documentary film, and four music videos from the album, Dancing Forever (2006).

On June 11, 2007, she held a promotional event for the album at Taipei Arena in Taipei, Taiwan. On June 13, 2007, EMI announced that it sold more than 100,000 copies in Taiwan in its first week of release. On June 17, 2007, she held an album signing session in Taipei, Taiwan. It topped the weekly video album sales charts of G-Music and Five Music in the first week of release, and it reached number two and number one on the video album sales charts of 2006 of G-Music and Five Music, respectively.

Title and artwork 
The title of the album came from China Times' review after the Hong Kong dates of Dancing Forever World Tour, they stated: "Jolin Tsai is not a talent like Faye Wong or Jay Chou. She works hard to achieve everything step by step. Like some people in our lives, she just wants to work hard to see the results, and the reason why she is so successful is because she works harder than we do." Tsai said: "There are some talents who would be half way to dull because of pride and complacency, there are some mediocre people who would not hesitate to spend their strength to work hard, let themselves become special, become a legend! As long as you insist, mediocre people and talent can also be no difference."

Track listing

Release history

References

External links 
 

2007 live albums
2007 video albums
EMI Music Taiwan live albums
EMI Music Taiwan video albums
Jolin Tsai live albums
Jolin Tsai video albums